James Blake was the defending champion, but lost in the quarterfinals to Sam Querrey.

Third-seeded Dmitry Tursunov won in the final 6–4, 7–5, against Frank Dancevic.

Seeds

Draw

Finals

Top half

Bottom half

External links
 Draw
 Qualifying draw

Singles